R.M. Sumeda Jagath Ranasinghe (born 10 February 1991) is a Sri Lankan javelin thrower. With a distance of 83.04 metres, and a new Sri Lankan record, Ranasinghe achieved the qualifying standard for the javelin at the 2016 Summer Olympics.

He was born in Kegalle had his education at Kegalu Vidyalaya.

Seasonal bests by year

2015 - 83.04
2016 - 80.25

See also
 Sri Lanka at the 2016 Summer Olympics

References

External links
 

Living people
Sri Lankan male javelin throwers
Athletes (track and field) at the 2016 Summer Olympics
Olympic athletes of Sri Lanka
1991 births
People from Kegalle District
South Asian Games silver medalists for Sri Lanka
South Asian Games medalists in athletics